Harukyo Nomura (born 25 November 1992) is a Japanese female professional golfer.

Having a Korean mother and Japanese father, Nomura moved to South Korea at the age of five and lived in Seoul until she graduated from the Myongji High School. In 2011, she selected Japanese nationality.

Career
Nomura started to play golf at age of 11, and in 2007 she won the Japan Junior Golf Championship for girls 12–14 years of age. Nomura was the low amateur at the 2009 Japan Women's Open. She turned pro in December 2010 after qualifying for the LPGA Tour on her first attempt, finishing tied for 39th at the LPGA Final Qualifying Tournament to earn Priority List Category 20 for the 2011 season. She qualified for the 2011 U.S. Women's Open through one of the sectional qualifying tournaments. Her first professional victory came on the LPGA Futures Tour in April 2011 at the Daytona Beach Invitational. She followed this with a win on the LPGA of Japan Tour in May 2011 and her third victory came on the LPGA of Korea Tour in 2015. In 2013 she was runner-up at the Mizuno Classic on the LPGA Tour.

On 21 February 2016, Nomura held off world number one Lydia Ko to win her first LPGA tournament, the ISPS Handa Women's Australian Open, the first Japanese victory on the LPGA Tour since Mika Miyazato won the Safeway Classic in 2012. With the victory, Nomura moved from 67th to 50th in the Women's World Golf Rankings and into second on the 2016 LPGA Tour Money List.

Professional wins (6)

LPGA Tour (3)

Co-sanctioned by the Ladies European Tour and the ALPG Tour.

LPGA Tour playoff record (1–0)

LPGA of Japan Tour (1)

LPGA of Korea Tour (1)

LPGA Futures Tour (1)
2011 Daytona Beach Invitational

Results in LPGA majors
Results not in chronological order before 2019.

^ The Evian Championship was added as a major in 2013.

CUT = missed the half-way cut
WD = withdrew
NT = no tournament
T = tied

Summary

Most consecutive cuts made – 11 (2015 Evian – 2017 Evian)
Longest streak of top-10s – 1

Team appearances
Professional
International Crown (representing Japan): 2016

References

External links
 

Profile on Seoul Sisters site

Japanese female golfers
LPGA Tour golfers
Olympic golfers of Japan
Golfers at the 2016 Summer Olympics
Japanese people of Korean descent
Sportspeople from Yokohama
Golfers from Honolulu
1992 births
Living people